Nicole Luchanski (born December 20, 1989 in Edmonton, Alberta) is a Canadian baseball player. She is a member of the Canada women's national baseball team which won a silver medal at the 2015 Pan American Games.

Playing career

Baseball
She has competed with the Canadian national team in five IBAF Women’s World Cups (2006, 2008, 2010, 2012, 2014). In the bronze medal game of the 2012 Women’s World Cup, a 17-13 victory against Australia, Luchanski hit the first home run of the event. Of note, it was an inside the park home run, making Luchanski the only player at the event to hit a home run.
In 2014, she competed with Team Alberta, winning a gold medal at the Senior Women’s Invitational National Championships in Canada. She also had the opportunity to train with Hall of Fame second baseman Roberto Alomar at Whalley Athletic Park in Surrey, British Columbia. It was part of the second day of training camp leading up to the 2014 Women's World Cup.

Awards and honours
 2010 Jimmy Rattlesnake Award
 2012 IBAF Women’s World Cup of Baseball All-Tournament Team

Personal
She graduated from the University of Alberta in 2013 with a Bachelor of Science in Forestry.

References

1989 births
Canadian female baseball players
Baseball people from Alberta
Living people
Sportspeople from Edmonton
Baseball players at the 2015 Pan American Games
Pan American Games silver medalists for Canada
Pan American Games medalists in baseball
Medalists at the 2015 Pan American Games